The 2019–20 2. Frauen-Bundesliga was the 16th season of Germany's second-tier women's football league, and the second as a single-division league. The season began on 10 August 2019 and ended on 1 March 2020. The champions and runners-up were promoted to the Frauen-Bundesliga, while no teams were relegated to the Frauen-Regionalliga.

The season was cancelled on 1 March 2020.

Effects of the COVID-19 pandemic
Due to the COVID-19 pandemic in Germany, on 8 March 2020 the Federal Minister of Health, Jens Spahn recommended cancelling events with more than 1,000 people. On 13 March, the DFB announced that fixtures on matchday 17 (13–15 March) were postponed. On 16 March, it was announced that the league was suspended until 19 April. On 3 April, the suspension was extended until 30 April. A decision on the resumption of the competition, similar to the Bundesliga and 2. Bundesliga, took place at an extraordinary meeting of the DFB-Bundestag on 25 May 2020. During that meeting, it was announced that the season would be cancelled with two teams getting promoted and none relegated.

Teams

Team changes

Stadiums

League table

Results

Top scorers

References

External links

2019-20
2019–20 in German women's football leagues
Germany